Narayanadri Express (numbered:12733/12734) is a superfast train belonging to Indian Railways, operated between  and Tirupati.

Etymology 
The train is named after one of the seven hills of Tirupati.

Inauguration date
This train was inaugurated by Chief Minister of Andhra Pradesh on Monday, July 1, 1991.

Halts
This train stops at Renigunta Jn, Srikalahasti, Venkatagiri, Gudur Jn, Nellore, Kavali, Singarayakonda, Ongole, Chirala, Bapatla, Tenali Jn, Guntur Jn, Sattenapalle, Piduguralla, Nadikude Jn, Vishnupuram, Miryalaguda, Nalgonda, Chityala, Ramannapet, Bibinagar, Secunderabad Jn, Begumpet.

Schedule
12733/34 runs Daily firm both the sides

Coach composition
LHB coach
 1 EOG
 1 SLR
 1 AC 3 Tier(Economy)
 1 AC 1 Tier
 1 AC 2 Tier
 2 General Unreserved
 6 AC 3 Tier
 9 Sleeper

References 

Transport in Tirupati
Transport in Secunderabad
Railway services introduced in 1991
Named passenger trains of India
Express trains in India
Rail transport in Andhra Pradesh
Rail transport in Telangana
Rail transport in Karnataka